The Warehouse Group (TWG) was founded by Stephen Tindall in 1982, and is the largest retail group operating in New Zealand. It is a corporate group that consists of The Warehouse, Warehouse Stationery, Torpedo7, Noel Leeming, 1-day and TheMarket.

History
The first Warehouse group store opened in North Shore, Auckland in 1982. In 1994, Warehouse was added to the New Zealand Exchange, under the symbol TWH. In 1996, a distribution centre opened on the North Island. In 2000, it was added to the NZSE 10 index. Also in 2000, the group acquired Clint's Crazy Bargains and Silly Solly's in Australia.

In 2003 the Warehouse Australia brand was launched. In 2005, a lab store launched in the Hamilton suburb of Te Rapa. That same year, the Warehouse brand was relaunched with new lower-case logo, announced its plan to enter the liquor market and that it would end operations in Australia by Christmas. In 2005, Warehouse Australia was sold to Catalyst Investment Managers and Castle Harlan Australian Mezzanine Partners for A$92 million (NZ$99m).

In 2006 the Warehouse began selling alcoholic beverages in selected stores and launched a new set of stores branded 'The Warehouse Extra' at Sylvia Park, Auckland, which included full grocery as well as a pharmacy, bakery and photo processing. In 2007, the company celebrated its 25th birthday and marked the occasion by releasing 13,000 balloons, causing concerns from environmentalists. In 2008, Warehouse Extra stores were converted to the standard format. In 2009, the first smaller-concept store, The Warehouse Local, opens in Mosgiel. In 2010 the Warehouse opened a store in Gisborne, New Zealand, the first large format store since the opening of The Warehouse Sylvia Park in 2006. In 2012, The Warehouse ceased its instore pharmacy offer. Later that year, The Warehouse announced it is buying electronics retailer The Noel Leeming Group for $65 million.

In 2013 TW Group holds Click Madness, a one-day online only sale across all brands in the group. Also in 2013, TW Group Purchases Torpedo7, No. 1 Fitness, Shotgun Supplements, Shop HQ (pet.co.nz & baby.co.nz), and Insight Traders. In 2014, TW Group Buys R&R Sport and SchoolTex. That same year, the TW Group launches The Warehouse Group Financial Services after the takeover of Diners Club NZ. In 2014, the group purchased the New Zealand-based branches of Australian retail chain The Good Guys, turning their five NZ based stores into their various retail brands. In July 2017, TW Group announced that it intended to sell the Financial Services division, acquired in 2014, to SBS Bank for a reported $18 million by September. In 2018, TWG purchased the Appliance Shed brand to create the Noel Leeming Clearance Centre brand. In 2019, TWG launched TheMarket, a new online marketplace selling local and international brands.

In June 2020 the Warehouse Group announced that it would be laying off 1,080 jobs as a result of the economic effects of the COVID-19 pandemic in New Zealand. The company also announced that it would be closing down six stores including The Warehouse stores in Whangaparaoa, Johnsonville, Dunedin, the Warehouse Stationery in Te Awamutu, and the Noel Leeming stores in Henderson and Tokoroa.

On 20 July 2020 the Warehouse COO Pejman Okhovat announced that it could cut between 500 to 750 jobs as part of a proposed restructuring of the company. First Union general secretary Dennis Maga has criticised the company for using COVID-19 as an excuse to lay off hundreds of workers and to reduce the incomes of thousands of employees.

On 21 December the Warehouse Group announced that it was in a "confident enough position" to repay its NZ$67.8 million COVID-19 wage subsidy to the Government.

From early 2021 all Warehouse stores across the country stopped selling physical media including DVDs, Blu-Rays, CDs, and Vinyl Records. In May 2021, The Warehouse Group announced that fireworks would no longer be sold at The Warehouse stores. The Warehouse also started closing jewellery counters in July 2021.

Business
The Warehouse operates discount retail department stores selling a broad range of non-grocery and grocery products. As of January 2015, The Warehouse employed over 12,000 people in New Zealand. The Warehouse's corporate headquarters are located in North Shore, New Zealand.

Apart from its 240+ retail locations, it operates 2 distribution centres located in Wiri and in Rolleston, New Zealand as well as 13 online stores.

In addition to its own operations, it owns various brand names that are located within the stores. It has gardening facilities located in Auckland, Hamilton and in Christchurch. Along with its gardening brand Just, it also operates nearly 30 "in-company" brands.

The Warehouse is publicly traded on the New Zealand Stock Exchange with the security code WHS (TWH was used previously).

Criticism
In May 2007 to mark the 25th Birthday of The Warehouse the company released 13,000 balloons from Dairy Flat. This sparked concerns from the Department of Conservation and other environmentalists as the balloons have been known to endanger wildlife.

In December 2009 it was announced that The Warehouse staff would be taking industrial action due to issues with staff having their hours extended to 50-hour weeks in the lead up to Christmas and staff having to work late at night.

In December 2018 Noel Leeming was fined $200,000 for misleading consumers about their rights under the Consumer Guarantees Act (CGA) following a Commerce Commission prosecution. Noel Leeming was convicted on eight charges under the Fair Trading Act.

In March 2020 the Warehouse Group drew criticism when its directors prematurely announced that they were an "essential service" during the COVID-19 pandemic without consulting with the Government. The company faces a fine of NZ$500,000 if it is found to have breached the New Zealand Exchange's disclosure rules or is found to have profited from a rise in its share price stemming from the announcement. The company subsequently shut down its brands for the duration of the four-week lockdown with all staff being given full paid leave.

In early June 2020 the Warehouse Group was criticised by First Union coordinator Kate Davis for allegedly not consulting employees about a plan to lay off 1,080 workers and close six stores as a result of the COVID-19 pandemic.

Return policy
The company operates a comprehensive returns policy. A "60 day money back guarantee" policy (returns accepted for any reason) is available on most products, excluding underwear, pre-recorded media and perishable products.

Australian expansion
In 2000, the company entered the Australian retail market. It acquired the Clint's Crazy Bargains and Silly Solly's retail chains. At the time of purchase, those chains had around 117 stores.

In 2003 the company built a $33 million (AUD) distribution centre in Queensland, to service the country. Later that year, the company introduced its Tui and Tolas inventory management systems from New Zealand.

As of 2005, the Australian arm was still under-performing. Sales for 2005 were at $518.8 million (AUD), compared with $567.3 million (AUD) in 2004. The Warehouse Group Limited announced in November 2005 that it had entered into a conditional agreement to sell The Warehouse Australia business to Catalyst Investment Managers and its parent PPM Capital Limited (together, Catalyst) and Castle Harlan Australian Mezzanine Partners, acting on behalf of the CHAMP I and CHAMP II funds (CHAMP) for A$92 million (NZ$99m). The new entity was known as Australian Discount Retail (ADR). As part of the transaction, The Warehouse Australia's Sydney Head Office would be sold to Investec Wentworth Specialised Property Trust. While the effective date for the transaction was to be 27 November 2005, completion of the sale was expected in early 2006 and was subject to normal regulatory approvals.

At its formation ADR also purchased the discount store operations of Miller's Retail, including the Go-Lo, Crazy Clark's and Chickenfeed chains. There were 335 such stores at the time of sale.

After the sale of the Australian operation, Warehouse stores were renamed Sam's Warehouse.

The Warehouse Extra Hypermarkets
In June 2006, "The Warehouse Extra" opened at Sylvia Park, Auckland. It was the first of a planned chain of hypermarkets, at 135,000 sq ft (12,500 sq m). In a similar fashion to the Wal-Mart Supercenters of the United States, the foodmarket department aisles are placed at a perpendicular angle to the general merchandise. It is the first store to feature an in-store bakery, pharmacy and café, and instead of the usual tall industrial shelving, a more conventional store shelving system has been used. The store also features a lot less red than in traditional stores, but the familiar concrete floor still exists. The next branches of "The Warehouse Extra" were in Whangarei and Te Rapa in Hamilton. In October 2008 The Warehouse announced that they will be canning "The Warehouse Extra" format with stores reverting to the more traditional style of store coming months. There were four of The Warehouse Extra in Auckland (Albany, Manukau, Sylvia Park and Westgate). Today "The Warehouse Extra" brand is used on larger traditional stores nationwide, with many existing large stores have taken on "The Warehouse Extra" branding such as those in Lyall Bay (Wellington), Riccarton (Christchurch), South Dunedin and Palmerston North. Stores carrying "The Warehouse Extra" brand are typically larger, open later and carry a greater range than regular stores.

The Warehouse Local

On Thursday 23 July 2009, The Warehouse Group opened the first of its smaller-concept stores, The Warehouse Local, in Mosgiel. These stores are approximately 2000 square metres in size, compared with the usual 5000 square meters seen in larger locations. These stores also have single checkout counters, doing without dedicated Service, Jewellery and Entertainment counters which are present in most other stores. Another 3 stores were intended to be launched per year, following this concept.

While the "Local" naming is no longer used, smaller stores in Rolleston and St Lukes have opened using the smaller format.

Entry into e-commerce
In 2009, The Warehouse announced its entry into online shopping. The brands full range of products were available online by 2012, in time for the brand's 30th birthday.

The brand's offerings were also made available on New Zealand e-commerce platform The Market in 2019.

Store within a store
In 2017, The Warehouse Group unveiled its first "Store within a Store" (shortened to SWAS), with Warehouse Stationery moving into The Warehouse Auckland Airport after their lease at their previous Auckland Airport Mall premises ended.

The Warehouse SWAS stores have many similar features of typical Warehouse Stationery stores, including a range of computers, printers, office furniture, and stationery, as well as a Print & Copy Centre. The Warehouse departments, such as furniture and entertainment, merge with each other in a SWAS environment.

There are currently 25 SWAS Warehouse Stationery Stores operating across New Zealand .

Active subsidiaries
The Warehouse Group currently owns four flagship brand subsidiaries and one online shopping platform.

The Warehouse

The flagship store for the Group; founded in 1982 by Sir Stephen Tindall. The Warehouse sells items of essential use – sport equipment, gardening equipment, furniture, and so on. As a result of their branding and the distinctive colour of their buildings, The Warehouse's stores are colloquially known both within the organisation and within New Zealand as "Red Sheds". They compete mainly with Kmart in the discount department store sector, as well as a range of more specialised retailers such as hardware stores Mitre 10 and Bunnings Warehouse, automotive parts retailers Repco and Supercheap Auto, and electronics and homewares retailers such as Farmers, Harvey Norman and JB Hi-Fi.

Warehouse stationery

Warehouse Stationery is a blue coloured, big-box retail store similar to Australia's Officeworks or America's OfficeMax. Warehouse Stationery has products across multiple categories including Office Supplies, School Supplies, Fashion stationery, Technology, Furniture, Art & Craft, Ink & Toner. It competes with Paper Plus and Whitcoulls in books and stationery, electronics retailers such as JB Hi-Fi and Harvey Norman, as well as OfficeMax in business and stationery online.

They also provide customers with a BizRewards membership you can shop and collect rewards points at The Warehouse and Warehouse Stationery stores nationwide & online.

Choose a Credit Account membership and you’ll also collect points in store at Noel Leeming.

The first Warehouse Stationery branch was opened in 1991 and grew from 8 stores in 1995 to 70 stores from Kerikeri to Invercargill as of 2019.

Torpedo7

Torpedo7 is a multi-channel subsidiary that own and run online stores Torpedo7 (a sports and outdoor equipment retailer), 1-day.co.nz, (an online daily deals site) and Number One Fitness (selling exercise equipment).

Based in Hamilton, New Zealand, Torpedo7 was founded in 2004 by mountain bike enthusiast Luke Howard-Willis, and his father, Guy Howard-Willis. A 51% stake was purchased by The Warehouse Group for NZ$33 million in 2013. While The Warehouse Group now has full ownership (through Torpedo7's ultimate parent company, Boye Developments Limited), Torpedo7 continues to operate as a standalone business. In October 2014, seven R&R Sport stores previously acquired by The Warehouse Group in December 2013 rebranded as Torpedo7. Combined with two brand new physical stores, this marked Torpedo7's first foray into bricks-and-mortar retail. R&R Sport was founded in 1981 in Dunedin as Recycled Recreation, a store specialising in second hand sports gear.

Noel leeming

Noel Leeming is a retail electronics chain, selling a range of computers, household appliances, TVs and audio equipment. It has 71 stores, including 20 in Auckland. It offers a larger selection of higher-value electronic goods than The Warehouse Group's other chains. It also operates Tech Solutions, an electronics and whiteware support, installation and learning service for technology users, including both in-store and in-home customers.

The brand was founded as "Noel Leeming Television" in 1973, taking its name from its founder. The first Noel Leeming branch opened in 1973 in Barrington Park Mall in Christchurch. The brand continued to expand through the South Island. The brand opened their first North Island branch in Auckland in 1986.  Leeming retired as managing director of the brand in mid-1992. Rapid expansion continued across the North Island through 1993.

The brand merged with Bond & Bond in September 1996 under trading group "Pacific Retail Group". At the time the group had approximately 90 branches across the country, made up of both brands.

Pacific Retail Group was bought by Gresham Private Equity in 2004 and was renamed "Noel Leeming Group".

Noel Leeming had 57 stores in 2008.

The Warehouse Group acquired Noel Leeming Group from Gresham Private Equity for NZ$65 million, effective from 10 December 2012. In December 2013, Noel Leeming Group acquired Maclean Technology, a team that delivers specialist professional IT services to New Zealand companies.

Themarket

TheMarket is an e-commerce shopping platform that sells products from over 250 retailers and brands from around the world similar to Amazon. The online marketplace is based in Auckland, with its head office located in Newmarket. TheMarket is part of The Warehouse Group's transformation strategy, which began in February 2017 to invest in "the digital future". Appointing global e-commerce expert Justus Wilde as Chief Executive, TheMarket team began working on the project early 2018. Adopting a startup mindset, within fourteen months from inception to launch the mobile-first platform launched publicly 1 August 2019, after a beta period during July.

While the TheMarket holds some of its own inventory, TheMarket primarily operates using a drop shipping business model where third-party business-to-consumer (B2C) retailers’ list branded products and dispatch orders. TheMarket launched with 100+ retailers in August 2019 and grew to 200+ retailers by November 2019. TheMarket expects that to increase to 400+ in early 2020. TheMarket launched its first subscription program, TheMarket Club, on 6 November 2019 (9) which offers free shipping as well as stream services and "echoes global giant Amazon".

TheMarket uses an established an organised network of ‘MarketPoint’ sites within The Warehouse Groups’ existing 242 physical locations throughout New Zealand, including The Warehouse, Warehouse Stationery, Noel Leeming and Torpedo7 stores and Rural MarketPoint sites are operated by FarmSource in partnership with Fonterra. Currently, there are 72 MarketPoint sites with plans to expand to 300 nationwide. MarketPoint's are sites within existing retail stores where customers can collect and return goods purchased from TheMarket, similar to what Amazon does with Amazon Hub or ASOS.com’s Click and Collect.

Previous subsidiaries

The warehouse group financial services limited
The Warehouse Group Financial Services Limited was a joint venture that was formed in 2001 following the joint acquisition of Diners Club New Zealand by The Warehouse Group and Westpac Banking Corporation.

The Warehouse Group Financial Services Limited provides consumer credit cards and insurance through The Warehouse brand and distribution channels. In the 2014 Annual Report, it is stated that The Group holds a 49% minority share in this financial arm of TW Group with Westpac holding a 51% majority share.

On 1 October 2015 TW Group announced the acquisition of the remaining 51% of TW Group Financial Services from Westpac. The acquisition cost $7.3 million (NZD). Later in the release TW Group also announce their plans to expand the unit not by acquisition but by internal expansion.

In July 2017, less than two years following the acquisition from Westpac, The Warehouse Group announced the sale of the financial services division.  The division had been slow to return a profit and returned a bigger loss then expected.  The division was sold to FinanceNow, a division of SBS Bank.

Bond and bond

Bond & Bond (stylised as Bond+Bond) was a retail electronics store founded by Enoch Bond, in Silverdale, Auckland in 1875. The store opened its first home appliance branch in Auckland in 1894. It was previously a subsidiary of the Noel Leeming Group before the group's acquisition by The Warehouse Group in 2012.

The chain had 31 stores in 2008. It had 24 stores in early 2013, including ten in Auckland.

In 2013, Bond & Bond was merged into Noel Leeming as part of a decision to provide a clear focus on the flagship Noel Leeming brand. Bond & Bond remained as an online clearance website until its closure in 2014.

R&r sport

R&R Sport was an independent outdoor chain established in Dunedin Central in 1981. By 2014, it had 10 stores, including two in Auckland.

In 2014, The Warehouse Group took over the chain and rebranded its stores as Torpedo 7.

Financial results
The Warehouse went public in 1995. Since then the stock has climbed from $1.29 to $5.54 in 2005 then to $2.605 as of 8 January 2015. During 2005, the stock dropped dramatically due to worse than expected results from the Australian operation.

In the financial year ended September 2015, The Warehouse Group reported a revenue of NZ$2.77 billion (up 4.6% on the previous financial year) and profits of NZ$57.1 million (down nearly 6% on the last financial year). Online sales made up NZ$150 million of their revenue – a rise of nearly 800% from just NZ$18.8 million in 2011, though still barely 0.56% of their total sales. While The Warehouse and Warehouse Stationery recorded strong profit growth, the Noel Leeming electronics store division reported a drop in profit of 43% (partly due to one-off rebranding costs). The Torpedo7 Group (including Torpedo7, R&R Fitness, Shotgun Supplements and No.1 Fitness) recorded a profit just above break-even, hit by change and rebranding costs. Meanwhile, the Warehouse Financial Services division recorded a $1.9 million loss, "in line with expectations".

References

External links

 

Department stores of New Zealand
Retail companies of New Zealand
Companies based in Auckland
Companies listed on the New Zealand Exchange
Retail companies established in 1982
Discount stores
New Zealand companies established in 1982